Northcliff High School, commonly known as Northcliff High, is a public English medium co-educational high school located in the suburb of Blackheath in Johannesburg in the Gauteng province of South Africa. It is one of the top and most academic schools in Gauteng. The high school was established in 1969.

Location
The school is located on Mountain View Drive, at the bottom of Northcliff Hill.

Sporting

Northcliff High has won the A-League Inter-High Athletics competition for 22 consecutive years, from 1997 - 2018.

In 2015, construction of an astroturf hockey field started. At the time, the school was the only government school in the area to own one.

A bear was the First Rugby team mascot in 1973. It featured in every First Rugby team photo until 1987.  In 2018 the mascot was returned to the school by the 1990 First Rugby team Captain.

Northcliff won the A-league inter-high gala several times.

Controversy 

In June 2017, Northcliff High was embroiled in a religious sensitivity scandal after it required its female Muslim students to carry concession cards in order to wear a head scarf to school. It was claimed that this was to make sure that the uniform rules were upheld.</ref>

Transformation

According to a Sunday Times investigative report, Northcliff was named as Gauteng's least representative school staff-wise, with its academic staff consisting of 96% white staff members. The figures for Northcliff High School were according to teaching staff lists and photos on the school's website as the school refused to reveal its numbers to the press.

Past and present heads of school
The following have been the heads of the school:

 Mr Ged Dickerson (1969 - 1986)
 Mr Peter Cawdry (1986 - 1997)
 Mr David Klein (1997 - 2002)
 Mrs Samantha Jandersen (2002-2002)
 Mr Walter Essex-Clark (2003 - date)

Notable alumni
 Shane Burger - Scotland international cricket coach 
 Connell Cruise - Singer-songwriter 
 Clive Eksteen - South African international cricket player
 Neville Godwin - Professional tennis player and coach 
 Darrien Landsberg - Professional Rugby Player 
 Traverse Le Goff - Member of Parliament
 Sean Roberts - Professional football player
 Jonathan Roxmouth - Stage actor 
 Max Sorensen - Irish international cricket player 
 Byron Talbot - Professional tennis player and Wimbledon doubles contestant
 Emmanuel Tshituka - Professional Rugby Player
 Vincent Tshituka - Professional Rugby Player
 Sharne Wehmeyer - South African international field hockey player

References

External links
Northcliff High School

Schools in Gauteng